Sandra "Sandy" Heim (born 25 June 1995) is a Swiss ice hockey goaltender, currently playing in the Swiss Women's League (SWHL A) with the ZHC Lions Frauen. As a member of the Swiss national team, she participated in the 2015 IIHF Women's World Championship.

Her college ice hockey career was played with the MacEwan Griffins women's ice hockey program in the Alberta Colleges Athletic Conference (ACAC) of U Sports during 2015 to 2019.

References

External links
 

1995 births
Living people
MacEwan University alumni
People from Interlaken-Oberhasli District
Sportspeople from the canton of Bern
Swiss expatriate ice hockey people
Swiss expatriate sportspeople in Canada
Swiss women's ice hockey goaltenders
Swiss Women's League players